Two main types of seals were used in the Ancient Near East, the stamp seal and the cylinder seal. Stamp seals first appeared in ‘administrative’ contexts in central and northern Mesopotamia in the seventh millennium and were used exclusively until the fifth millennium. Cylinder seals appeared first around 3600 bc in southern Mesopotamia and south-western Iran (Middle Uruk Period). They gradually replaced stamp seals, becoming the tool of a rising class of bureaucrats in the early stages of state formation. Even though stamp seals were still produced in the third and second millennia, cylinder seals predominated. In the first millennium, stamp seals made a strong comeback and eventually replaced cylinder seals entirely.

Containers that were sealed: jars, boxes, baskets, sacks

Place names and sites

Eshnunna (T. Asmar), 
Shaduppum (T. Harmal),  
Mari (Tell Hariri), 
Sippar-Yahrurum (T. Abu Habbah), 
Sippar-Amnanum (T. ed-Der), 
Babylon (near al-Hillah), 
Kish (T. Uhaimir), 
Nippur (T. Nuffar), 
Larsa (T. Senkereh),
Isin (Ishan Bahriyat), 
Kisurra (T. Abu Hatab) 
Ur (T. el-Muqayyar)
Urkesh (Tell Mozan)

References

General bibliography:

 Amiet, P. 1980 La Glyptique mésopotamienne archaique, Paris.
 Collon, Dominique 2005 (2nd revised edition). First impressions: Cylinder Seals in the Ancient Near East. London: British Museum.
 Collon, Dominique 2007. Babylonian Seals. In: Leick, Gwendolyn (ed), The Babylonian World: 95–123. New York & London: Routledge.
 Gibson, McG and R.D. Biggs (eds.) 1977. Seals and Sealing in the Ancient Near East. Bibliotheca Mesopotamica 6, Malibu.
 Gibson, McG. and R.D. Biggs (eds.) 1987. The Organization of Power. Aspects of Bureaucracy in the Ancient Near East. Studies in Ancient Oriental Civilizations 46. Chicago: Oriental Institute.
 Gorelick, L. and A. J. Gwinnett 1990, The Ancient near Eastern Cylinder Seal as Social Emblem and Status Symbol, Journal of Near Eastern Studies 49 (1): 45–56.
 Keel, O. and Uehlinger, C. (eds) 1990. Altorientalische Miniaturkunst. Die ältesten visuellen Massenkommunikationsmittel. Mainz, Gabern, pp. 27–46.
 Pittman, H. 1994 The Glazed Steatite Glyptic Style. The Structure and Function of an Image System in the Administration of Protoliterate Mesopotamia, BBVO 16, Berlin.
 Pittman, Holly 2013. Seals and Sealings in the Sumerian World. In: Crawford, Harriet (ed), The Sumerian World. New York & London: Routledge.
 Porada, E. 1947. Mesopotamian art in cylinder seals of the Pierpont Morgan Library. Pierpont Morgan Library.
 Porada, E., Amiet, P., Özgüç, N., & Boardman, J. (eds.) 1980. Ancient art in seals: essays. Princeton, N.J.: University Press.
 Radner, Karen 2009. Siegelpraxis, A. Philologisch, RlA: 466–469.
 Otto, Adelheid 2009. Siegelpraxis, B. Archäologisch. In RlA: 469–474.
 Teissier, B. 1984. Ancient Near Eastern Cylinder Seals from the Marcopoli Collection, Berkeley.

Manufacture and materials
 Moorey, R.  1994.  Ancient Mesopotamian Materials and Industries, esp. pp. 74–77 (on materials for seals) and pp. 103–106 (on seal cutting)
 Collon, D. 2005.  First Impressions, Cylinder Seals in the Ancient Near East. (2nd revised edition), pp. 100–104.
 Sax, M., and Meeks, N. D., 1994. The introduction of wheel-cutting as a technique for engraving cylinder seals: its distinction from filing, Iraq, 56, 153–66.
 Sax, M., D. Collon and M.N. Leese 1993. The availability of raw materials for Near Eastern cylinder seals during the Akkadian, post Akkadian and Ur III periods. Iraq 55: 77–90.
 Sax, M. N. D. Meeks and D. Collon 2000. The Early Development of the Lapidary Engraving Wheel in Mesopotamia. Iraq 62: 157–176.
 Sax, M., J. McNabb, N.D. Meeks 1998, Methods of Engraving Mesopotamian Cylinder Seals: Experimental Confirmation, Archaeometry 40: 1-21.
 Gorelick, L., and Gwinnett. A. J., 1992, Minoan versus Mesopotamian seals: comparative methods of manufacture, Iraq, 54: 51–64.
 Gwinnett, A. J. and Gorelick, L. 1987. The Change from Stone Drills to Copper Drills in Mesopotamia. Expedition 29 (3): 15–24.
 Heimpel, W., Gorelick, L., and Gwinnett, A. J., 1988, Philological and archaeological evidence for the use of emery in the Bronze Age Near East, Journal of Cuneiform Studies 40 (2): 195–210.

Prehistoric seals
 von Wickede 1990, Prähistorische Stempelsiegel in Vorderasien. MVAS 6: p. 10-21 (form), 21-28 (design)

Sealing practice:
 Duistermaat, K. 2010. Administration in Neolithic Societies? The First Use of Seals in Syria and Some Considerations on Seal Owners, Seal Use and Private Property. In Müller (ed.) Die Bedeutung Der Minoischen Und Mykenischen Glyptik: VI. Internationales Siegel-Symposium, Marburg, 9-12 Oktober 2008. (CMS Beiheft 8) Mainz am Rhein: Verlag Philipp von Zabern: 167–182.
 von Wickede 1990, Prähistorische Stempelsiegel in Vorderasien. MVAS 6
 Duistermaat, K. 2013.
 Rothman, Mitchell S. 1994. Sealings as a Control Mechanism in Prehistory: Tepe Gawra XI, X and VIII. In: Gil Stein & Mitchell S. Rothman (eds), Chiefdoms and Early States in the Near East: The Organizational dynamics of complexity: 103–120. Madison: Prehistory Press.

Uruk seals
 Brandes, M. A. 1979, Siegelabrollungen aus den archaischen Bauschichten in Uruk-Warka
 Amiet, P. 1980 P. Amiet, Glyptique mesoptaminne archaique. (Paris 1980)
 R. M. Boehmer 1999, Uruk. Früheste Siegelabrollungen. AUWE 24. (Mainz 1999)
 B. Feller 2013, Die Anfänge der Bürokratie. Funktion und Einsatz von Siegeln im 4. und 3. Jahrtausend v. Chr., in Uruk. 5000 Jahre Megacity. Begleitband zur Ausstellung "Uruk – 5000 Jahre Megacity", 159–165.
 M. Frangipane 2007 (Ed.), Arslantepe Cretulae. An Early Centralized Administrative System Before Writing. (Rome 2007)
 R. J. Matthews 2002, Secrets of the Dark Mound. (Warminster 2002)
 H. Pittman 2001, Mesopotamian Intraregional Relations Reflected through Glyptic Evidence in the late Chalcolithic 1-5 Periods, in M. Rothman (Ed.), Uruk Mesopotamia & its Neighbors. Cross-cultural Interactions in the Era of State Formation, 403–443.
 M. T. Rigillo 1991, Sealing Systems on Uruk Doors, BaM 22 (1991), 175-222 

Early Dynastic seals

Iconography:
 Pittmann, Holly 1994, The Glazed Steatite Glyptic Style: the Structure and Function of an Image System in the Administration of Protoliterate Mesopotamia. Berlin
 Karg, N. 1984, Untersuchungen zur älteren frühdynastischen Glyptik Babyloniens. Aspekte regionaler Entwicklungen in der ersten Hälfte des 3. Jahrtausends. BaF 8. Mainz
 Pittman, Holly 2013. Seals and Sealings in the Sumerian World. In: Crawford, Harriet (ed), The Sumerian World. New York & London: Routledge.

Sealing practice:
 Jans G. & Bretschneider J. 2011 (2012), Seals and Sealings of Tell Beydar/Nabada (Seasons 1995-2001). Subartu XXVII, Turnhout Brepols.
 H. P. Martin and R. J. Matthews 1993, "Seals and Sealings," in A. Green, ed., The 6G Ash-Tip and Its Contents: Cultic and Administrative Discard from the Temple? (London), pp. 23–81
 R. J. Matthews 1991, "Fragments of Officialdom from Fara," Iraq 53: 1–16
 Charvát, Petr 1988. Archaeology and Social History: The Susa sealings, ca. 4000–2340 BC, Paléorient 14(1): 57–63
 Charvát, Petr 2005. The Backs of Some Sealings from Nineveh 5. Iraq 67: 391–397.
 Zettler, R. 2007, Clay Sealings from the Early Dynastic I levels of the Inanna Temple at Nippur: a preliminary analysis, in Roth, M. W. Farber, and M. Stolper (eds), Studies presented to R. Biggs: 343–362.

Akkadian

Glyptic art:
 Rakic, Yelena 2003. The Contest Scene in Akkadian Glyptic: A Study of its imagery and function within the Akkadian empire. PhD thesis, University of Pennsylvania.
 Collon, D. Catalogue of the Western Asiatic Seals in the British Museum: Cylinder Seals, vol 2 Akkadian and Ur III.
 Boehmer, Rainer Michael 1965. Die Entwicklung der Glyptik während der Akkad-Zeit. (Untersuchungen zur Assyriologie und Vorderasiatischen Archäologie 4) Berlin: De Gruyter.
 Amiet, P.1980. The Mythological Repertory in Cylinder Seals of the Agade Period (c. 2335-2155 B.C.). In Porada (ed.), pp. 35–60.
 Barrelet, M.T. 1970. Etude de glyptique akkadienne: l'imagination figurative et le cycle d'Ea. Orientalia 39: 213–251.

Sealing practice:
 Rakic, Yelena 2003. The Contest Scene in Akkadian Glyptic: A Study of its imagery and function within the Akkadian empire. PhD thesis, University of Pennsylvania. esp. Ch. 6;289-354
 Matthews, D. Early Glyptic of Tell Brak, 176–183.

Ur III

Glyptic art:
 Collon, D. Catalogue of the Western Asiatic Seals in the British Museum: Cylinder Seals, vol 2 Akkadian and Ur III
 Winter, I. 1986 "The king and the cup: iconography of the royal presentation scene on Ur III seals," inInsights through Images (ed. by M Kelly-Buccellati), pp. 253 – 268. Malibu: Undena Publications. Bibliotheca Mesopotamica 21.
 Winter, I. 1991 (1977) "Legitimation of authority through image and legend: seals belonging to officials in the administrative bureaucracy of the Ur III state," in The Organization of Power (ed. by McGuire Gibson and R. Biggs), pp. 1 – 33. Chicago: Oriental Institute. Studies in Ancient Oriental Civilization 46.
 Suter 2010 (representation of the king)
 Mayr, R. H. 2002a. The depiction of ordinary men and women on the seals of the Ur III kingdom. In Parpola, S. and Whiting, R. M., editors, Sex and Gender in the Ancient Near East: Proceedings of the 47th Rencontre Assyriologique Internationale, Helsinki, July 2–6, 2001, pages 359–366. Neo-Assyrian Text Corpus Project, Helsinki.

Sealing Ur III:
 Zettler 1987 "Sealings as artifacts of institutional administration in ancient Mesopotamia," Journal of Cuneiform Studies 39: 197 - 240.
 Reichel 2001, Reichel, Clemens 2001. Seals and Sealings at Tell Asmar – A New look at an Ur III to Isin/Larsa Palace. In: William Hallo & Irene J. Winter (eds.): 101–131.
 Buccellati, G. / M. Kelly-Buccellati, The Royal Storehouse of Urkesh: The Glyptic Evidence from the Southwestern Wing. AfO 42/43, 1995/96, 1-32.

Sealing documents:
 Hattori, Atsuko 2001. Sealing Practices of Ur III Nippur. In: William Hallo & Irene J. Winter (eds): 71–99.
 Hattori, Atsuko 2002. Texts and Impressions: A Holistic approach to Ur III cuneiform tablets from the university of Pennsylvania expeditions to Nippur (Iraq). PhD thesis, University of Pennsylvania.
 Laurito, R.  in  D’Agostino, Franco, Francesco Pomponio & Romina Laurito 2004. Neo-Sumerian Texts from Ur in the British Museum: Epigraphical and archaeological catalogue of an unpublished corpus of texts and fragments. (Nisaba 5) Messina: Di.Sc.A.M.
 Tsouparopoulou, Christina 2015. The Ur III seals impressed on documents from Puzrish-Dagan (Drehem), HSAO 16, Heidelberg
 Fischer, Claudia 1992. Siegelabrollungen im British Museum auf neusumerischen Tontafeln aus der Provinz Lagash – Untersuchungen zu den Tierkampfszenen. Zeitschrift für Assyriologie 82: 60–91.
 Fischer, Claudia 1997. Siegelabrollungen im British Museum auf Ur-III-zeitlichen Texten aus der Provinz Lagash: Untersuchung zu den Verehrungsszenen. Baghdader Mitteilungen 28: 97–183.
 Reichel, Clemens 2003. Appendix: Sealing practice. In: Markus Hilgert, Drehem Administrative Documents from the Reign of Amar-Suena (Oriental Institute Publications 121): 603–24. Chicago: The Oriental Institute.

Isin-Larsa / Old Babylonian 
 Blocher, Felix 2001. Sealing Tablets in Early Second Millennium Babylonia - Wealth and Significance of the Yale Babylonian Collection, in: William W. Hallo (Hg.), Seals and Seal Impressions, Comptes rendus de la XLV Rencontre Assyriologique Internationale (Boston/New Haven 5–10 July 1998), Vol. 3, New Haven/Boston, 133–148.
 Collon, D. 2007. Babylonian Seals in Leick, G. (ed) The Babylonian World: 95-123 (esp. pp. 95–107)
 Goddeeris, A. 2012. Sealing in Old Babylonian Nippur, in Fs Van Lerberghe pp. 215–234.
 Gailani-Werr, L. al-, Chronological Table of Old Babyblonian Seal Impressions. Bulletin of the Institute of Archaeology, University of London 17, 1980, 33-84
 Gailani-Werr, L. al-, Studies in the Chronology and Regional Style of Old Babylonian Cylinder Seals. BiMes. 23, 1988
 Klengel-Brandt, E., Siegelabrollungen auf altbabylonischen Tontafeln aus Babylon. AoF 10, 1983, 65-106
 Blocher, F., Siegelabrollungen auf frühaltbabylonischen Tontafeln in der Yale Babylonian Collection, ein Katalog. MVS 9. München 1992
 Blocher, F., Siegelabrollungen auf frühaltbabylonischen Tontafeln im British Museum, ein Katalog. MVS 10. München 1992

Mitanni and Kassite
 Salje, Beate 1990. Der "Common Style" der Mitanni-Glyptik und die Glyptik der Levante und Zyperns in der späten Bronzezeit. Baghdader Forschungen, Band 11. Mainz: Zabern.
 Porada, E., Seal Impressions from Nuzi. AASOR 24. New Haven 1947
 Stein, D.L., A Reapraisal of the "Saushtatar Letter" from Nuzi. ZA 79, 1989, 36-60
 Stein, D.L., Seal Impressions from Arrapha and Nuzi in the Yale Babylonian Collection, in: D.I. Owen - M.A. Morrison (Hrsg.), Studies on the Civilization and Culture of Nuzi and the Hurrians Vol. 2. Winona Lake 1987, 225-320
 Stein, D.L., The Seal Impressions, in: G. Wilhelm (Hrsg.), Das Archiv des Shilwa-Teshup, Heft 8 und 9. Wiesbaden 1993
 Beran, T., Die babylonische Glyptik der Kassitenzeit. AfO, 1957–58, 255-278
 Matthews, D. M. Principles of Composition in Near Eastern Glyptic of the Later Second Millennium B.C. (1990)
 Matthews, D.M., The Kassite Glyptic of Nippur. OBO 116. Freiburg (Schweiz) 1992
 Wittmann, B., Babylonische Rollsiegel des 11.-7. Jahrhunderts v. Chr. BaM 23, 1992, 169 ff. (Nachtrag: Wittmann-von Pilgrim, B. in: BaM 25, 1994, 597 ff.)

Middle Assyrian
 Moortgat, A., Assyrische Glyptik des 12. Jahrhunderts. ZA NF 14, 1944, 24-44
 Moortgat, A., Assyrische Glyptik des 13. Jahrhunderts. ZA NF 13, 1942, 50-88
 Beran, T., Assyrische Glyptik des 14. Jahrhunderts. ZA NF 18, 1957, 141-215
 Kühne, Hartmut 1995. Der mittelassyrische, Cut Style', in ZA 85: 277-301
 Kühne, H. / W. Röllig, Das Siegel des Königs Salmanasser I. von Assyrien, in: Emre, K. / M. Mellink / B. Hrouda / N. Özgüç (Hrsg.), Anatolia and the Ancient Near East: Studies in Honor of Tahsin Özgüç. Ankara 1989, 295-299

Sealing practices:
 Röllig, W. 1980. Notizen zur Praxis der Siegelung in mittelassyrischer Zeit. Welt des Orients 11: 111–116.
 Postgate, Nicholas J. 1986. Middle Assyrian Tablets: The Instruments of bureaucracy. AoF 13: 10–39.
 Postgate, Nicholas J. 2003. Documents in Government under the Middle Assyrian Kingdom. In: M. Brosius (ed.): 124–138.
 Postgate, Nicholas J. 2014. Bronze Age Bureaucracy: Writing and the practice of government in Assyria. NY: CUP.
 Feller, Barbara forthcoming. Siegel im Kontext der Gesellschaft. Die Siegelabrollungen auf den mittelassyrischen Tontafeln aus dem Vorderasiatischen Museum Berlin.

Seals (insignia)
Archaeology of the Near East
Cylinder and impression seals in archaeology